Claude Guichard (11 November 1928 – 30 August 2021) was a French politician and academic.

Biography
Guichard was born in Sainte-Foy-la-Grande on 11 November 1928. He was a substitute for Yves Guéna for the Independent Republicans in the National Assembly for Dordogne's 1st constituency, as Guéna was twice named Minister of Information. He served from 8 May 1967 to 30 May 1968 and again from 13 August 1968 to 1 April 1973.

Claude Guichard died on 30 August 2021 at the age of 92.

References

1928 births
2021 deaths
Deputies of the 3rd National Assembly of the French Fifth Republic
Deputies of the 4th National Assembly of the French Fifth Republic
Independent Republicans politicians
People from Gironde
Politicians from Nouvelle-Aquitaine